Cody Harris may refer to:

 Cody Harris (politician), American politician in Texas
 Cody Harris (darts player), New Zealand darts player